Nino Konis Santana (12 January 1957 in Vero, Tutuala, Lautém District – 11 March 1998 in Ermera District) was an East Timorese freedom fighter who led the Falintil militia between April 1993 and his death in March 1998 during the Indonesian occupation of East Timor, succeeding Ma'huno Bulerek Karathayano after the latter's capture in 1993. Santana died in an accident, after he was shot in the leg during an Indonesian ambush. He was succeeded by Taur Matan Ruak.

See also 
 Indonesian invasion of East Timor

References 

East Timorese politicians
1957 births
1998 deaths
People from Lautém District
Military personnel killed in action
East Timorese military personnel
Accidental deaths in Asia